Berić is a Serbo-Croatian surname. Notable people with the surname include:

Aleksandar Berić (1906–1941), Yugoslav military officer
Miroslav Berić (born 1973), Serbian basketball player
Robert Berić, Slovenian footballer

See also
Berović

Serbian surnames